The existence of God (or more generally, the existence of deities) is a subject of debate in theology, philosophy of religion and popular culture. A wide variety of arguments for and against the existence of God or deities can be categorized as logical, empirical, metaphysical, subjective or scientific. In philosophical terms, the question of the existence of God or deities involves the disciplines of epistemology (the nature and scope of knowledge) and ontology (study of the nature of being, existence, or reality) and the theory of value (since some definitions of God include "perfection").

The Western tradition of philosophical discussion of the existence of God or deities began with Plato and Aristotle, who made arguments that would now be categorized as cosmological. Other arguments for the existence of God or deities have been proposed by St. Anselm, who formulated the first ontological argument; Ibn Rushd (Averroes) and Thomas Aquinas, who presented their own versions of the cosmological argument (the kalam argument and the first way, respectively); René Descartes, who said that the existence of a benevolent God or deities is logically necessary for the evidence of the senses to be meaningful. John Calvin argued for a sensus divinitatis, which gives each human a knowledge of God's existence. Atheists view arguments for the existence of God or deities as insufficient, mistaken or outweighed by arguments against it, whereas some religions, such as Jainism, reject the possibility of a creator deity. Philosophers who have provided arguments against the existence of God include Friedrich Nietzsche and Bertrand Russell.

Positions 

Positions on the existence of deities can be divided along numerous axes, producing a variety of orthogonal classifications. Theism and atheism are positions of belief or lack of it, while gnosticism and agnosticism are positions of knowledge or the lack of it. Ignosticism concerns belief about God's conceptual coherence. Apatheism concerns belief about the practical importance of whether God exists.

For the purposes of discussion, Richard Dawkins described seven "milestones" on his spectrum of theistic probability:

 Strong theist. 100% probability that God exists. In the words of C.G. Jung: "I do not believe, I know."
 De facto theist. Very high probability but short of 100%. "I don't know for certain, but I strongly believe in God and live my life on the assumption that he is there."
 Leaning towards theism. Higher than 50% but not very high. "I am very uncertain, but I am inclined to believe in God."
 Completely impartial. Exactly 50%. "God's existence and nonexistence are exactly equiprobable."
 Leaning towards atheism. Lower than 50% but not very low. "I do not know whether God exists but I'm inclined to be skeptical."
 De facto atheist. Very low probability, but short of zero. "I don't know for certain but I think God is very improbable, and I live my life on the assumption that he is not there."
 Strong atheist. "I know there is no God, with the same conviction as Jung knows there is one."

Theism 

The Catholic Church, following the teachings of Paul the Apostle (e.g.), Thomas Aquinas, and the First Vatican Council, affirms that God's existence "can be known with certainty from the created world by the natural light of human reason".

Traditional religious definition of God 

In classical theism, God is characterized as the metaphysically ultimate being (the first, timeless, absolutely simple and sovereign being, who is devoid of any anthropomorphic qualities), in distinction to other conceptions such as theistic personalism, open theism, and process theism. Classical theists do not believe that God can be completely defined. They believe it would contradict the transcendent nature of God for mere humans to define him. Robert Barron explains by analogy that it seems impossible for a two-dimensional object to conceive of three-dimensional humans.

In modern Western societies, the concepts of God typically entail a monotheistic, supreme, ultimate, and personal being, as found in the Christian, Islamic and Jewish traditions. In monotheistic religions outside the Abrahamic traditions, the existence of God is discussed in similar terms. In these traditions, God is also identified as the author (either directly or by inspiration) of certain texts, or that certain texts describe specific historical events caused by the God in question or communications from God (whether in direct speech or via dreams or omens). Some traditions also believe that God is the entity which is currently answering prayers for intervention or information or opinions.

Many Islamic scholars have used philosophical and rational arguments to prove the existence of God. For example, Ibn Rushd, a 12th-century Islamic scholar, philosopher, and physician, states there are only two arguments worthy of adherence, both of which are found in what he calls the "Precious Book" (The Qur'an). Rushd cites "providence" and "invention" in using the Qur'an's parables to claim the existence of God. Rushd argues that the Earth's weather patterns are conditioned to support human life; thus, if the planet is so finely-tuned to maintain life, then it suggests a fine tuner - God. The Sun and the Moon are not just random objects floating in the Milky Way, rather they serve us day and night, and the way nature works and how life is formed, humankind benefits from it. Rushd essentially comes to a conclusion that there has to be a higher being who has made everything perfectly to serve the needs of human beings.

Moses ben Maimon, widely known as Maimonides, was a Jewish scholar who tried to logically prove the existence of God. Maimonides offered proofs for the existence of God, but he did not begin with defining God first, like many others do. Rather, he used the description of the earth and the universe to prove the existence of God. He talked about the Heavenly bodies and how they are committed to eternal motion. Maimonides argued that because every physical object is finite, it can only contain a finite amount of power. If everything in the universe, which includes all the planets and the stars, is finite, then there has to be an infinite power to push forth the motion of everything in the universe. Narrowing down to an infinite being, the only thing that can explain the motion is an infinite being (meaning God) which is neither a body nor a force in the body. Maimonides believed that this argument gives us a ground to believe that God is, not an idea of what God is. He believed that God cannot be understood or be compared.

Non-personal definitions of God 

In pantheism, God and the universe are considered to be the same thing. In this view, the natural sciences are essentially studying the nature of God. This definition of God creates the philosophical problem that a universe with God and one without God are the same, other than the words used to describe it.

Deism and panentheism assert that there is a God distinct from, or which extends beyond (either in time or in space or in some other way) the universe. These positions deny that God intervenes in the operation of the universe, including communicating with humans personally. The notion that God never intervenes or communicates with the universe, or may have evolved into the universe (as in pandeism), makes it difficult, if not by definition impossible, to distinguish between a universe with God and one without.

The Ethics of Baruch Spinoza gave two demonstrations of the existence of God. The God of Spinoza is uncaused by any external force and has no free will, it is not personal and not anthropomorphic.

Debate about how theism should be argued 

In Christian faith, theologians and philosophers  make a distinction between: (a) preambles of faith and (b) articles of faith. The preambles include alleged truths contained in revelation which are nevertheless demonstrable by reason, e.g., the immortality of the soul, the existence of God. The articles of faith, on the other hand, contain truths that cannot be proven or reached by reason alone and presuppose the truths of the preambles, e.g., the Holy Trinity, is not demonstrable and presupposes the existence of God.

The argument that the existence of God can be known to all, even prior to exposure to any divine revelation, predates Christianity. Paul the Apostle made this argument when he said that pagans were without excuse because "since the creation of the world God's invisible nature, namely, his eternal power and deity, has been clearly perceived in the things that have been made". In this, Paul alludes to the proofs for a creator, later enunciated by Thomas Aquinas and others, but that had also been explored by the Greek philosophers.

Another apologetical school of thought, including Dutch and American Reformed thinkers (such as Abraham Kuyper, Benjamin Warfield, Herman Dooyeweerd), emerged in the late 1920s. This school was instituted by Cornelius Van Til, and came to be popularly called presuppositional apologetics (though Van Til himself felt "transcendental" would be a more accurate title). The main distinction between this approach and the more classical evidentialist approach is that the presuppositionalist denies any common ground between the believer and the non-believer, except that which the non-believer denies, namely, the assumption of the truth of the theistic worldview. In other words, presuppositionalists do not believe that the existence of God can be proven by appeal to raw, uninterpreted, or "brute" facts, which have the same (theoretical) meaning to people with fundamentally different worldviews, because they deny that such a condition is even possible. They claim that the only possible proof for the existence of God is that the very same belief is the necessary condition to the intelligibility of all other human experience and action. They attempt to prove the existence of God by means of appeal to the transcendental necessity of the belief—indirectly (by appeal to the unavowed presuppositions of the non-believer's worldview) rather than directly (by appeal to some form of common factuality). In practice this school utilizes what have come to be known as transcendental arguments. In these arguments they claim to demonstrate that all human experience and action (even the condition of unbelief, itself) is a proof for the existence of God, because God's existence is the necessary condition of their intelligibility.

Some Christians note that the Christian faith teaches "salvation is by faith", and that faith is reliance upon the faithfulness of God. The most extreme example of this position is called fideism, which holds that faith is simply the will to believe, and argues that if God's existence were rationally demonstrable, faith in its existence would become superfluous. Søren Kierkegaard argued that objective knowledge, such as 1+1=2, is unimportant to existence. If God could rationally be proven, his existence would be unimportant to humans. It is because God cannot rationally be proven that his existence is important to us. In The Justification of Knowledge, the Calvinist theologian Robert L. Reymond argues that believers should not attempt to prove the existence of God. Since he believes all such proofs are fundamentally unsound, believers should not place their confidence in them, much less resort to them in discussions with non-believers; rather, they should accept the content of revelation by faith. Reymond's position is similar to that of his mentor Gordon Clark, which holds that all worldviews are based on certain unprovable first premises (or, axioms), and therefore are ultimately unprovable. The Christian theist therefore must simply choose to start with Christianity rather than anything else, by a "leap of faith". This position is also sometimes called presuppositional apologetics, but should not be confused with the Van Tillian variety.

Atheism 

The atheistic conclusion is that the arguments and evidence both indicate there is insufficient reason to believe that any gods exist, and that personal subjective religious experiences say something about the human experience rather than the nature of reality itself; therefore, one has no reason to believe that a god exists.

Positive atheism 

Positive atheism (also called "strong atheism" and "hard atheism") is a form of atheism that asserts that no deities exist. The strong atheist explicitly asserts the non-existence of gods.

Negative atheism 

Negative atheism (also called "weak atheism" and "soft atheism") is any type of atheism other than positive, wherein a person does not believe in the existence of any deities, but does not explicitly assert there to be none.

Agnosticism 

Agnosticism is the view that the truth value of certain claims—especially claims about the existence of any deity, but also other religious and metaphysical claims—is unknown or unknowable. Agnosticism does not define one's belief or disbelief in gods; agnostics may still identify themselves as theists or atheists.

Strong agnosticism 

Strong agnosticism is the belief that it is impossible for humans to know whether or not any deities exist.

Weak agnosticism 

Weak agnosticism is the belief that the existence or nonexistence of deities is unknown but not necessarily unknowable.

Agnostic theism 

Agnostic theism is the philosophical view that encompasses both theism and agnosticism. An agnostic theist believes in the existence of a god or God, but regards the basis of this proposition as unknown or inherently unknowable. Agnostic theists may also insist on ignorance regarding the properties of the gods they believe in.

Agnostic atheism 

Agnostic atheism is a philosophical position that encompasses both atheism and agnosticism. Agnostic atheists are atheistic because they do not hold a belief in the existence of any deity and agnostic because they claim that the existence of a deity is either unknowable in principle or currently unknown in fact.

The theologian Robert Flint explains:

Apatheism 

An apatheist is someone who is not interested in accepting or denying any claims that gods exist or do not exist. An apatheist lives as if there are no gods and explains natural phenomena without reference to any deities. The existence of gods is not rejected, but may be designated unnecessary or useless; gods neither provide purpose to life, nor influence everyday life, according to this view.

Ignosticism 

The ignostic (or igtheist) usually concludes that the question of God's existence or nonexistence is usually not worth discussing because concepts like "God" are usually not sufficiently or clearly defined. Ignosticism or igtheism is the theological position that every other theological position (including agnosticism and atheism) assumes too much about the concept of God and many other theological concepts. It can be defined as encompassing two related views about the existence of God. The view that a coherent definition of God must be presented before the question of the existence of God can be meaningfully discussed. Furthermore, if that definition is unfalsifiable, the ignostic takes the theological noncognitivist position that the question of the existence of God (per that definition) is meaningless. In this case, the concept of God is not considered meaningless; the term "God" is considered meaningless. The second view is synonymous with theological noncognitivism, and skips the step of first asking "What is meant by 'God'?" before proclaiming the original question "Does God exist?" as meaningless.

Some philosophers have seen ignosticism as a variation of agnosticism or atheism, while others have considered it to be distinct. An ignostic maintains that he cannot even say whether he is a theist or an atheist until a sufficient definition of theism is put forth.

The term "ignosticism" was coined in the 1960s by Sherwin Wine, a rabbi and a founding figure of Humanistic Judaism. The term "igtheism" was coined by the secular humanist Paul Kurtz in his 1992 book The New Skepticism.

Philosophical issues

The problem of the supernatural 

One problem posed by the question of the existence of God is that traditional beliefs usually ascribe to God various supernatural powers. Supernatural beings may be able to conceal and reveal themselves for their own purposes, as for example in the tale of Baucis and Philemon. In addition, according to concepts of God, God is not part of the natural order, but the ultimate creator of nature and of the scientific laws. Thus in Aristotelian philosophy, God is viewed as part of the explanatory structure needed to support scientific conclusions and any powers God possesses are—strictly speaking—of the natural order that is derived from God's place as originator of nature (see also Monadology).

In Karl Popper's philosophy of science, belief in a supernatural God is outside the natural domain of scientific investigation because all scientific hypotheses must be falsifiable in the natural world. The non-overlapping magisteria view proposed by Stephen Jay Gould also holds that the existence (or otherwise) of God is irrelevant to and beyond the domain of science.

Scientists follow the scientific method, within which theories must be verifiable by physical experiment. The majority of prominent conceptions of God explicitly or effectively posit a being whose existence is not testable either by proof or disproof. Therefore, the question of God's existence may lie outside the purview of modern science by definition. The Catholic Church maintains that knowledge of the existence of God is the "natural light of human reason". Fideists maintain that belief in God's existence may not be amenable to demonstration or refutation, but rests on faith alone.

Logical positivists such as Rudolf Carnap and A. J. Ayer viewed any talk of gods as literal nonsense. For the logical positivists and adherents of similar schools of thought, statements about religious or other transcendent experiences can not have a truth value, and are deemed to be without meaning, because such statements do not have any clear verification criteria. As the Christian biologist Scott C. Todd put it "Even if all the data pointed to an intelligent designer, such a hypothesis is excluded from science because it is not naturalistic." This argument limits the domain of science to the empirically observable and limits the domain of God to the empirically unprovable.

Nature of relevant proofs and arguments 

John Polkinghorne suggests that the nearest analogy to the existence of God in physics is the ideas of quantum mechanics which are seemingly paradoxical but make sense of a great deal of disparate data.

Alvin Plantinga compares the question of the existence of God to the question of the existence of other minds, claiming both are notoriously impossible to "prove" against a determined skeptic.

One approach, suggested by writers such as Stephen D. Unwin, is to treat (particular versions of) theism and naturalism as though they were two hypotheses in the Bayesian sense, to list certain data (or alleged data), about the world, and to suggest that the likelihoods of these data are significantly higher under one hypothesis than the other. Most of the arguments for, or against, the existence of God can be seen as pointing to particular aspects of the universe in this way. In almost all cases it is not seriously suggested by proponents of the arguments that they are irrefutable, merely that they make one worldview seem significantly more likely than the other. However, since an assessment of the weight of evidence depends on the prior probability that is assigned to each worldview, arguments that a theist finds convincing may seem thin to an atheist and vice versa.

Philosophers, such as Wittgenstein, take a view that is considered anti-realist and oppose philosophical arguments related to God's existence. For instance, Charles Taylor contends that the real is whatever will not go away. If we cannot reduce talk about God to anything else, or replace it, or prove it false, then perhaps God is as real as anything else.

In George Berkeley's A Treatise Concerning the Principles of Human Knowledge of 1710, he argued that a "naked thought" cannot exist, and that a perception is a thought; therefore only minds can be proven to exist, since all else is merely an idea conveyed by a perception. From this Berkeley argued that the universe is based upon observation and is non-objective. However, he noted that the universe includes "ideas" not perceptible to humankind, and that there must, therefore, exist an omniscient superobserver, which perceives such things. Berkeley considered this proof of the existence of the Christian god.

C.S. Lewis, in Mere Christianity and elsewhere, raised the argument from desire. He posed that all natural desires have a natural object. One thirsts, and there exists water to quench this thirst; One hungers, and there exists food to satisfy this hunger. He then argued that the human desire for perfect justice, perfect peace, perfect happiness, and other intangibles strongly implies the existence of such things, though they seem unobtainable on earth. He further posed that the unquenchable desires of this life strongly imply that we are intended for a different life, necessarily governed by a God who can provide the desired intangibles.

Outside of Western thought 

Existence in absolute truth is central to Vedanta epistemology. Traditional sense perception based approaches were put into question as possibly misleading due to preconceived or superimposed ideas. But though all object-cognition can be doubted, the existence of the doubter remains a fact even in nastika traditions of mayavada schools following Adi Shankara. The five eternal principles to be discussed under ontology, beginning with God or Isvara, the Ultimate Reality cannot be established by the means of logic alone, and often require superior proof.
In Vaisnavism Vishnu, or his intimate ontological form of Krishna, is equated to the personal absolute God of the Western traditions.

Arguments

Arguments for the existence of God or gods

Logical arguments

Aquinas' Five Ways 

In article 3, question 2, first part of his Summa Theologica, Thomas Aquinas developed his five arguments for God's existence. These arguments are grounded in an Aristotelian ontology and make use of the infinite regression argument. Aquinas did not intend to fully prove the existence of God as he is orthodoxly conceived (with all of his traditional attributes), but proposed his Five Ways as a first stage, which he built upon later in his work. Aquinas' Five Ways argued from the unmoved mover, first cause, necessary being, argument from degree, and the argument from final cause.

 The unmoved mover argument: an event may or may not happen, so everything must be created by something that must exist
 The first cause argument: nothing is self-existent, so everything must be created by something that is self-existent
 The necessary being argument: reality is contingent, so everything must be created by something that is immutable
 The degree argument: no good thing is supremely good, so everything must be created by something that is supremely good
 The final cause argument: life has a purpose, so everything must be created by something that determines the purpose of life

Cosmological argument 

The cosmological argument is an a posteriori argument for a cause or reason for the cosmos.

One type of cosmological, or "first cause" argument, typically called the Kalam cosmological argument, asserts that since everything that begins to exist has a cause, and the universe began to exist, the universe must have had a cause which was itself not caused. This ultimate first cause is identified with God. Christian apologist William Lane Craig gives a version of this argument in the following form:

 Whatever begins to exist has a cause.
 The Universe began to exist.
 Therefore, the Universe had a cause.

Ontological argument 

The ontological argument has been formulated by philosophers including St. Anselm and René Descartes. The argument proposes that God's existence is self-evident. The logic, depending on the formulation, reads roughly as follows:

Thomas Aquinas criticized the argument for proposing a definition of God which, if God is transcendent, should be impossible for humans. Immanuel Kant criticized the proof from a logical standpoint: he stated that the term "God" really signifies two different terms: both idea of God, and God. Kant concluded that the proof is equivocation, based on the ambiguity of the word God. Kant also challenged the argument's assumption that existence is a predicate (of perfection) because it does not add anything to the essence of a being. If existence is not a predicate, then it is not necessarily true that the greatest possible being exists. A common rebuttal to Kant's critique is that, although "existence" does add something to both the concept and the reality of God, the concept would be vastly different if its referent is an unreal Being. Another response to Kant is attributed to Alvin Plantinga, who says that even if one were to grant that existence is not a real predicate, necessary existence, which is the correct formulation of an understanding of God, is a real predicate.

Empirical arguments

Argument from beauty

Indirect argument from consciousness

Argument from design

Rational warrant 

Philosopher Stephen Toulmin is notable for his work in the history of ideas that features the (rational) warrant: a statement that connects the premises to a conclusion.

Joseph Hinman applied Toulmin's approach in his argument for the existence of God, particularly in his book The Trace of God: A Rational Warrant for Belief. Instead of attempting to prove the existence of God, Hinman argues you can "demonstrate the rationally-warranted nature of belief".

Hinman uses a wide range of studies, including ones by Robert Wuthnow, Andrew Greeley, Mathes and Kathleen Nobel to establish that mystical experiences are life-transformative in a way that is significant, positive and lasting. He draws on additional work to add several additional major points to his argument. First, the people who have these experiences not only do not exhibit traditional signs of mental illness but, often, are in better mental and physical health than the general population due to the experience. Second, the experiences work. In other words, they provide a framework for navigating life that is useful and effective. All of the evidence of the positive effects of the experience upon people's lives he, adapting a term from Derrida, terms "the trace of God": the footprints left behind that point to the impact.

Finally, he discusses how both religious experience and belief in God is, and has always been, normative among humans: people do not need to prove the existence of God. If there is no need to prove, Hinman argues, and the Trace of God (for instance, the impact of mystical experiences on them), belief in God is rationally warranted.

Inductive arguments 

Some have put forward arguments for the existence of God based on inductive reasoning. For example, one class of philosophers asserts that the proofs for the existence of God present a fairly large probability though not absolute certainty. A number of obscure points, they say, always remain; an act of faith is required to dismiss these difficulties. This view is maintained, among others, by the Scottish statesman Arthur Balfour in his book The Foundations of Belief (1895). The opinions set forth in this work were adopted in France by Ferdinand Brunetière, the editor of the Revue des deux Mondes. Many orthodox Protestants express themselves in the same manner, as, for instance, Dr. E. Dennert, President of the Kepler Society, in his work Ist Gott tot?

Subjective arguments

Arguments from witnesses' testimony 

Arguments from testimony rely on the testimony or experience of witnesses, possibly embodying the propositions of a specific revealed religion. Swinburne argues that it is a principle of rationality that one should accept testimony unless there are strong reasons for not doing so.

 The witness argument gives credibility to personal witnesses, contemporary and throughout the ages. A variation of this is the argument from miracles (also referred to as "the priest stories") which relies on testimony of supernatural events to establish the existence of God.
 The majority argument argues that the theism of people throughout most of recorded history and in many different places provides prima facie demonstration of God's existence.
 Islam asserts that the revelation of its holy book, the Qur'an, and its unique literary attributes, vindicate its divine authorship, and thus the existence of God.
 The Church of Jesus Christ of Latter-day Saints, also known as Mormonism, similarly asserts that the miraculous appearance of God, Jesus Christ, and angels to Joseph Smith and others and subsequent finding and translation of the Book of Mormon establishes the existence of God. The whole Latter Day Saint movement makes the same claim for example Community of Christ, Church of Christ (Temple Lot), Church of Jesus Christ (Bickertonite), Church of Jesus Christ of Latter Day Saints (Strangite), Church of Jesus Christ (Cutlerite), etc.
 The Church of Jesus Christ of Latter Day Saints (Strangite), similarly asserts that the finding and translation of the Plates of Laban, also known as the Brass Plates, into the Book of the Law of the Lord and Voree plates by James Strang, One Mighty and Strong, establishes the existence of God.
 Various sects that have broken from the Church of Christ (Temple Lot) (such as Church of Christ "With the Elijah Message" and Church of Christ (Assured Way)) claim that the message brought by John the Baptist, One Mighty and Strong, to Otto Fetting and W. A. Draves in The Word of the Lord Brought to Mankind by an Angel establishes the existence of God.

Arguments from historical events 
 Christianity and Judaism assert that God intervened in key specific moments in history, especially at the Exodus and the giving of the Ten Commandments in front of all the tribes of Israel, positing an argument from empirical evidence stemming from sheer number of witnesses, thus demonstrating his existence.
 Christological arguments assert that certain events of the Christian New Testament are historically accurate, and prove God's existence, namely:
 The Resurrection of Jesus (an argument from miracles)

Arguments from the authority of historical personages 
These arguments are an appeal to authority:
 The claims of Jesus, as a morally upstanding person, to be the son of God 
 Jesus, said to be a wise person, believed that God exists 
 The belief of Lekhraj Kripalani, who founded the Brahma Kumaris religion  when God was said to enter his body

Anecdotal arguments 

 The sincere seeker's argument, espoused by Muslim Sufis of the Tasawwuf tradition, posits that every individual who follows a formulaic path towards guidance, arrives at the same destination of conviction in the existence of God and specifically in the monotheistic tenets and laws of Islam. This apparent natural law for guidance and belief could only be consistent if the formula and supplication were being answered by the same Divine entity being addressed, as claimed in Islamic revelations. This was formally organized by Imam Abu Hamid Al-Ghazali in such notable works as "Deliverance from Error" and "The Alchemy of Happiness," in Arabic "Kimiya-yi sa'ādat". The path includes following the golden rule of no harm to others and treating others with compassion, silence or minimal speech, seclusion, daily fasting or minimalist diet of water and basic nourishment, honest wages, and daily supplication towards "the Creator of the Universe" for guidance.
 The Argument from a proper basis argues that belief in God is "properly basic"; that it is similar to statements like "I see a chair" or "I feel pain". Such beliefs are non-falsifiable and, thus, neither provable nor disprovable; they concern perceptual beliefs or indisputable mental states.
 In Germany, the School of Friedrich Heinrich Jacobi taught that human reason is able to perceive the suprasensible. Jacobi distinguished three faculties: sense, reason, and understanding. Just as sense has immediate perception of the material so has reason immediate perception of the immaterial, while the understanding brings these perceptions to a person's consciousness and unites them to one another. God's existence, then, cannot be proven (Jacobi, like Immanuel Kant, rejected the absolute value of the principle of causality), it must be felt by the mind.
 The same theory was advocated in Germany by Friedrich Schleiermacher, who assumed an inner religious sense by means of which people feel religious truths. According to Schleiermacher, religion consists solely in this inner perception, and dogmatic doctrines are inessential.

Hindu arguments 

The school of Vedanta argues that one of the proofs of the existence of God is the law of karma. In a commentary to Brahma Sutras (III, 2, 38, and 41), Adi Sankara argues that the original karmic actions themselves cannot bring about the proper results at some future time; neither can super sensuous, non-intelligent qualities like adrsta by themselves mediate the appropriate, justly deserved pleasure and pain. The fruits, according to him must be administered through the action of a conscious agent, namely, a supreme being (Ishvara). The Nyaya school make similar arguments.

Other arguments 

 The evolutionary argument against naturalism, which argues that naturalistic evolution is incapable of providing humans with the cognitive apparatus necessary for their knowledge to have positive epistemic status.
 An argument from belief in God being properly basic as presented by Alvin Plantinga.
 Argument from Personal Identity.
 Argument from the "divine attributes of scientific law".

Arguments against the existence of God or gods 

The arguments below aim to show that a god or set of gods does not exist—by showing a creator is unnecessary or contradictory, at odds with known scientific or historical facts, or that there is insufficient proof that a god does exist.

Logical arguments 

The following arguments deduce, mostly through self-contradiction, the non-existence of a God as "the Creator".

 No lasting scientific evidence of God's existence has been found. Therefore, in the case of a worldview that relies solely on scientific evidence, whether or not God exists is unknown; or even, God does not exist (depending on the strength of such a worldview).
 Stephen Hawking and co-author Leonard Mlodinow state in their book The Grand Design that it is reasonable to ask who or what created the universe, but if the answer is God, then the question has merely been deflected to that of who created God. Both authors claim that it is possible to answer these questions purely within the realm of science, and without invoking any divine beings. Christian scholars, like Leonhard Euler and Bernard d'Espagnat, disagree with that kind of skeptical argument.
 Dawkins' Ultimate Boeing 747 gambit analogizes the above. Some theists argue that evolution and abiogenesis are akin to a hurricane assembling a Boeing 747 — that the universe (or life) is too complex, cannot be made by non-living matter alone and would have to be designed by someone, who theists call God. Dawkin's counter-argument is that such a God would himself be complex — the "Ultimate" Boeing 747 — and therefore require a designer.
 Theological noncognitivism is the argument that religious language – specifically, words such as "God" – are not cognitively meaningful and that irreducible definitions of God are circular.
 The analogy of Russell's teapot argues that the burden of proof for the existence of God lies with the theist rather than the atheist; it can be considered an extension of Occam's Razor.

Arguments from incompatible divine properties 

Some arguments focus on the existence of specific conceptions of God as being omniscient, omnipotent, and morally perfect.

 The omnipotence paradox suggests that the concept of an omnipotent entity is logically contradictory by considering questions such as "Can God create a rock so big that He cannot move it?" or "If God is all powerful, could God create a being more powerful than Himself?"
 Similarly, the omniscience paradox argues that God cannot be omniscient because he would not know how to create something unknown to himself.
 Another argument points to the contradiction of omniscience and omnipotence arguing that God is bound to follow whatever God foreknows himself doing.
 Argument from free will contends that omniscience and the free will of humanity are incompatible and that any conception of God that incorporates both properties is therefore inherently contradictory: if God is omniscient, then God already knows humanity's future, contradicting the claim of free will.
 The anthropic argument states that if God is omniscient, omnipotent, and morally perfect, he would have created other morally perfect beings instead of imperfect ones, such as humans.
 The problem of hell is the idea that eternal damnation contradicts God's omnibenevolence and omnipresence.
 The Transcendental Argument for the Non-existence of God contests the existence of an intelligent Creator God by demonstrating that such a being would make logic and morality contingent, which is incompatible with the presuppositionalist assertion that they are necessary, and contradicts the efficacy of science.
 The "no reason" argument tries to show that an omnipotent and omniscient being would not have any reason to act in any way, specifically by creating the universe, because it would have no needs, wants, or desires since these very concepts are subjectively human. Since the universe exists, there is a contradiction, and therefore, an omnipotent god cannot exist. This argument is expounded upon by Scott Adams in the book God's Debris, which puts forward a form of Pandeism as its fundamental theological model. A similar argument is put forward in Ludwig von Mises's "Human Action". He referred to it as the "praxeological argument" and claimed that a perfect being would have long ago satisfied all its wants and desires and would no longer be able to take action in the present without proving that it had been unable to achieve its wants faster—showing it imperfect.
 The atheist-existential argument for the non-existence of a perfect sentient being states that if existence precedes essence, it follows from the meaning of the term sentient that a sentient being cannot be complete or perfect. It is touched upon by Jean-Paul Sartre in Being and Nothingness. Sartre's phrasing is that God would be a pour-soi [a being-for-itself; a consciousness] who is also an en-soi [a being-in-itself; a thing]: which is a contradiction in terms. The argument is echoed thus in Salman Rushdie's novel Grimus: "That which is complete is also dead."

Empirical arguments 

The following empirical arguments rely on observations or experimentation to yield their conclusions.

Argument from inconsistent revelations

Argument from parsimony 

The argument from parsimony (using Occam's razor) contends that since natural (non-supernatural) theories adequately explain the development of religion and belief in gods, the actual existence of such supernatural agents is superfluous and may be dismissed unless otherwise proven to be required to explain the phenomenon.

Argument from historical induction 

The argument from "historical induction" concludes that since most theistic religions throughout history (e.g. ancient Egyptian religion, ancient Greek religion) and their gods ultimately come to be regarded as untrue or incorrect, all theistic religions, including contemporary ones, are therefore most likely untrue/incorrect by induction. H. L. Mencken wrote a short piece about the topic entitled "Memorial Service" in 1922. It is implied as part of Stephen F. Roberts' popular quotation:

I contend that we are both atheists. I just believe in one fewer god than you do. When you understand why you dismiss all the other possible gods, you will understand why I dismiss yours.

Argument from nonbelief

Arguments from the poor design of the universe 

The problem of evil contests the existence of a god who is both omnipotent and omnibenevolent by arguing that such a god should not permit the existence of evil or suffering. The theist responses are called theodicies. Similarly, the argument from poor design contends that an all-powerful, benevolent creator god would not have created lifeforms, including humans, which seem to exhibit poor design.

Richard Carrier has argued that the universe itself seems to be very ill-designed for life, because the vast majority of the space in the universe is utterly hostile to it. This is arguably unexpected on the hypothesis that the universe was designed by a god, especially a personal god. Carrier contends that such a god could have easily created a geocentric universe ex nihilo in the recent past, in which most of the volume of the universe is inhabitable by humans and other lifeforms— precisely the kind of universe that most humans believed in until the rise of modern science. While a personal god might have created the kind of universe we observe, Carrier contends that this is not the kind of universe we would most likely expect to see if such a god existed. He finally argues that, unlike theism, our observations about the nature of the universe are strongly expected on the hypothesis of atheism, since the universe would have to be vast, very old, and almost completely devoid of life if life were to have arisen by sheer chance.

Subjective arguments 

Similar to the subjective arguments for the existence of God, subjective arguments against God's existence mainly rely on the testimony or experience of witnesses, or the propositions of a revealed religion in general.

 The witness argument gives credibility to personal witnesses, contemporary and from the past, who disbelieve or strongly doubt the existence of God.
 The conflicted religions argument notes that many religions give differing accounts as to what God is and what God wants; since all the contradictory accounts cannot be correct, many if not all religions must be incorrect.
 The disappointment argument claims that if, when asked for, there is no visible help from God, there is no reason to believe that there is a God.

Hindu arguments 

Atheistic Hindu doctrines cite various arguments for rejecting a creator God or Ishvara. The IAST of the Samkhya school states that there is no philosophical place for a creator God in this system. It is also argued in this text that the existence of Ishvara (God) cannot be proved and hence cannot be admitted to exist. Classical Samkhya argues against the existence of God on metaphysical grounds. For instance, it argues that an unchanging God cannot be the source of an ever-changing world. It says God is a necessary metaphysical assumption demanded by circumstances. The Sutras of Samkhya endeavor to prove that the idea of God is inconceivable and self-contradictory, and some commentaries speak plainly on this subject. The Sankhya- tattva-kaumudi, commenting on Karika 57, argues that a perfect God can have no need to create a world, and if God's motive is kindness, Samkhya questions whether it is reasonable to call into existence beings who while non-existent had no suffering. Samkhya postulates that a benevolent deity ought to create only happy creatures, not an imperfect world like the real world.

According to Sinha, the following arguments were given by Samkhya philosophers against the idea of an eternal, self-caused, creator God:

 If the existence of karma is assumed, the proposition of God as a moral governor of the universe is unnecessary. For, if God enforces the consequences of actions then he can do so without karma. If however, he is assumed to be within the law of karma, then karma itself would be the giver of consequences and there would be no need of a God.
 Even if karma is denied, God still cannot be the enforcer of consequences. Because the motives of an enforcer God would be either egoistic or altruistic. Now, God's motives cannot be assumed to be altruistic because an altruistic God would not create a world so full of suffering. If his motives are assumed to be egoistic, then God must be thought to have desire, as agency or authority cannot be established in the absence of desire. However, assuming that God has desire would contradict God's eternal freedom which necessitates no compulsion in actions. Moreover, desire, according to Samkhya, is an attribute of prakṛti and cannot be thought to grow in God. 
 Despite arguments to the contrary, if God is still assumed to contain unfulfilled desires, this would cause him to suffer pain and other similar human experiences. Such a worldly God would be no better than Samkhya's notion of higher self.
 Furthermore, there is no proof of the existence of God. He is not the object of perception, there exists no general proposition that can prove him by inference.

Therefore, Samkhya maintained that the various cosmological, ontological and teleological arguments could not prove God.

Proponents of the school of Mimamsa, which is based on rituals and orthopraxy, decided that the evidence allegedly proving the existence of God is insufficient. They argue that there is no need to postulate a maker for the world, just as there is no need for an author to compose the Vedas or a god to validate the rituals. Mimamsa argues that the gods named in the Vedas have no existence apart from the mantras that speak their names. In that regard, the power of the mantras is what is seen as the power of gods.

Psychological aspects 

Several authors have offered psychological or sociological explanations for belief in the existence of deities.

Psychologists observe that the majority of humans often ask existential questions such as "why we are here" and whether life has purpose. Some psychologists have posited that religious beliefs may recruit cognitive mechanisms in order to satisfy these questions. William James emphasized the inner religious struggle between melancholy and happiness, and pointed to trance as a cognitive mechanism. Sigmund Freud stressed fear and pain, the need for a powerful parental figure, the obsessional nature of ritual, and the hypnotic state a community can induce as contributing factors to the psychology of religion.

Pascal Boyer's Religion Explained (2002), based in part on his anthropological field work, treats belief in God as the result of the brain's tendency towards agency detection. Boyer suggests that, because of evolutionary pressures, humans err on the side of attributing agency where there is not any. In Boyer's view, belief in supernatural entities spreads and becomes culturally fixed because of their memorability. The concept of "minimally counterintuitive" beings that differ from the ordinary in a small number of ways (such as being invisible, able to fly, or having access to strategic and otherwise secret information) leave a lasting impression that spreads through word-of-mouth.

Scott Atran's In Gods We Trust: The Evolutionary Landscape of Religion (2002) makes a similar argument and adds examination of the socially coordinating aspects of shared belief. In Minds and Gods: The Cognitive Foundations of Religion, Todd Tremlin follows Boyer in arguing that universal human cognitive process naturally produces the concept of the supernatural. Tremlin contends that an agency detection device (ADD) and a theory of mind module (ToMM) lead humans to suspect an agent behind every event. Natural events for which there is no obvious agent may be attributed to God (c.f. Act of God).

See also 

 Apologetics
 Copleston–Russell debate
 Christian existential apologetics
 Efficacy of prayer
 The Existence of God (book)
 Existence of Jesus
 Gödel's ontological proof
 Is There a God?
 Metaphysics
 Pascal's Wager
 Problem of evil
 Problem of the creator of God
 Rationalism
 Relationship between religion and science
 Spectrum of theistic probability
 The Atheist Experience
 Transcendental theology

References

Further reading 

 Richard Dawkins, The God Delusion, Black Swan, 2007.
 Christopher Hitchens, God is Not Great: How Religion Poisons Everything. Twelve Books, 2007.
 Hick, John, ed. (1964). The Existence of God: Readings, in The Problems of Philosophy Series. New York: Macmillan Co.

External links 

 A Collection of Arguments for the Existence of God
 Proofs of God's Existence: Islam—Ahmadiyyat (PDF)
 The Existence of God—Catholic Encyclopedia
 The Classical Islamic Arguments for the Existence of God by Majid Fakhry

Arguments against the existence of God
Arguments for the existence of God
Religious controversies
Philosophy of religion
Deities
Singular God
Philosophical problems